Guerra de Empresas (January 2011) (Spanish for "War of the Promotions") was an annual professional wrestling major event produced by Mexican professional wrestling promotion International Wrestling Revolution Group (IWRG), which took place on January 2, 2011 in Arena Naucalpan, Naucalpan, State of Mexico, Mexico. IWRG's Guerra de Empresas series of events all center around inter-promotional competition with tag teams representing IWRG as well as a number of other wrestling promotions represented by one or more tag teams. While wrestlers all represented their "home" promotion most had competed on IWRG events prior to this event, either through IWRG's working relationship with AAA or due to be in independent contractors and not signed exclusively with one specific wrestling promotion. The show was unofficially the 15th IWRG Anniversary Show, but not officially promoted as an anniversary show.

Production

Background
The Guerra de Empresas ("War of the Promotions") concept is a recurring tournament between representatives of various Mexican wrestling promotions hosted by different promotions over time, International Wrestling Revolution Group (IWRG; Sometimes referred to as Grupo Internacional Revolución in Spanish) hosted the first one in 2010 and has hosted one or more Guerra de Empresas each year since then, while also sending representatives to other promotions for their Guerra de Empresas shows. The Guerra de Empresas tournament was normally a single-elimination tag team tournament with eight teams fighting for the trophy. The IWRG Guerra de Empresas shows, as well as the majority of the IWRG shows in general, are held in "Arena Naucalpan", owned by the promoters of IWRG and their main arena. The January 2011 Guerra de Empresas show was the second IWRG promoted a show under that name.

Storylines
The event featured nine professional wrestling matches with different wrestlers involved in pre-existing scripted feuds, plots and storylines. Wrestlers were portrayed as either heels (referred to as rudos in Mexico, those that portray the "bad guys") or faces (técnicos in Mexico, the "good guy" characters) as they followed a series of tension-building events, which culminated in a wrestling match or series of matches.  IWRG's Guerra de Empresas series of events all center on inter-promotional competition with tag teams representing IWRG as well as a number of other wrestling promotions represented by one or more tag teams..

Guerra de Empresas 2011 participants

Results

Footnotes

References

External links 
 

2011 in professional wrestling
2011 in Mexico
15
January 2011 events in Mexico
2011.01